The Keck Institute for Space Studies (KISS) is a joint institute of the California Institute of Technology and the Jet Propulsion Laboratory established in January 2008 with a $24 million grant from the W. M. Keck Foundation. It is a privately funded think tank focused on space mission concepts and technology.

The 2011-2014 Global Go To Think Tank Index Reports (Think Tanks and Civil Societies Program, University of Pennsylvania), have listed KISS in the "Top Thirty Science and Technology Think Tanks".

The Founding Director of the Institute is Professor Tom Prince (2008–present).

History
Keck Institute for Space Studies was established in 2008 for the purpose of developing new ideas for revolutionary advances in space missions. It is funded by the W. M. Keck Foundation with a grant of $3 million per year over eight years and aims to bring together scientists and engineers from a broad range of backgrounds for sustained technical interactions.

Location
The Keck Institute for Space Studies is located in the Keck Center, which includes two buildings: the renovated Tolman/Bacher House and a new structure erected next door. The center, designed by Lehrer Architects, was dedicated on September 15, 2014, to honor the long-term support of Caltech by the W. M. Keck Foundation and its founder William Myron Keck.

The Tolman/Bacher house has been a home to two Caltech professors - Richard Tolman and Robert Bacher.

The Keck Center was recently given LEED (Leadership in Energy and Environmental Design) Platinum certification, the highest level of recognition for sustainability given by the U.S. Green Building Council. The project earned points for stabilizing and restoring the Tolman/Bacher House and for incorporating such details into the new building as abundant natural light, natural ventilation, and the ability to open up the lobby of the new building to take advantage of the complex's indoor and outdoor spaces.

References

External links 
KISS website

Space science organizations
Research institutes in California
Science and technology think tanks
Think tanks based in the United States
California Institute of Technology